Some Births Are Worse Than Murders is the debut EP by The Blackeyed Susans, released in March 1989 on Waterfront Records.

The Blackeyed Susans was formed in Perth in 1989 as a side project for Martha's Vineyard, Chad's Tree and the Triffids members, including David McComb. They played eight gigs and recorded four songs before their "day jobs" forced them to put the project on hold. The songs became Some Births are Worse than Murders.  The EP was acclaimed by music critics nationally and in the UK, the record spent several weeks at No. l on the independent charts in Australia.

Track listing 
 "Don’t Call Yourself An Angel" (David McComb, Phil Kakulas) – 3:14
 "Enemy Mine" (David McComb, Phil Kakulas) – 4:07
 "Viva Las Vegas" (Doc Pomus, Mort Shuman) – 5:10
 "Cripple Creek" (Traditional/Phil Kakulas) – 4:47

Personnel

Blackeyed Susans
 David McComb – vocals, guitar, percussion
 Rob Snarski – vocals, guitar
 Phil Kakulas – double bass, electric bass, bazouki, guitar, backing vocals, percussion
 Alsy MacDonald – drums, percussion
 Ross Bolleter – hammond organ, piano, piano organ

Additional musicians
 William Akers – backing vocals

References

The Blackeyed Susans albums
1989 debut EPs